Heinrich August Pierer (26 February 1794 in Altenburg – 12 May 1850, Altenburg) was a German lexicographer and publisher known particularly for his Universal-Lexikon der Vergangenheit und Gegenwart, a multi-volume encyclopedic dictionary first published in 1835–6. It went through a number of editions, both during his lifetime and later.

He was the son of publisher Johann Friedrich Pierer (de) (1767–1832). He studied medicine at the University of Jena, afterwards being involved in the Napoleonic Wars. He fought in the Battle of Leipzig, being wounded at the storming of Wachau, and later participated in the Battle of Waterloo. Following the end of hostilities he worked as a schoolteacher in Posen, and in 1820 became a partner in his father's printing business, Pierer'sche Hofbuchdruckerei.

External links
 Pierer's Universal-Lexikon der Vergangenheit und Gegenwart, online version of the nineteen-volume fourth edition published posthumously in the years 1857–1865. Also at HathiTrust.
 Wikisource at Allgemeine Deutsche Biographie

1794 births
1850 deaths
German lexicographers
German publishers (people)
People from Altenburg
German male non-fiction writers
German encyclopedists
19th-century lexicographers